Donetsk Academic Regional Drama Theatre was a theatre in Mariupol in southern Ukraine. The modern theatre was constructed in 1960 in the approximate location of the former Church of Mary Magdalene. The theatre was largely destroyed by Russian airstrikes on 16 March 2022, resulting in the deaths of around 600 people.

The theatre was known as Donetsk Regional Drama Theatre before it was given academic status in November 2007.

History

 1847 – Records the first time a theatrical troupe came to Mariupol, under entrepreneur V. Vinogradova. As there was no theatre in the city the troupe gave its performances in a rented barn in Ekaterininskaya street (nowadays – Lenin Av.).
 1850 – 1860 – A barn in the courtyard of Popov (a local resident) provides the first theatrical venue – "The Temple of a Muse of the Melpomene". The building is fairly basic with elementary conditions, but here during several seasons many troupes performed. These included participation by provincial actors of that time: Alexandrov, Neverov, Medvedeva, Stoppel, Novitsky, Minsky, Prokofyev, Piloni and others.
 1878 – The first professional theatrical troupe appears in the city of Mariupol. The beginning of the Mariupol theatre is funded by the son of a rich merchant Vasily Shapovalov who has rented a room for the theatre. The career of actors I. Zagorsky, L. Zagorsky, L. Linitskaja and others begins here.
 1887 – Opening of the newly built theatre on November 8, named the Concert Hall (subsequently Winter Theatre). It has a big stage, comfortable seating, a place for the orchestra,  and an auditorium for 800.
 1880 – 1890 – Performances of outstanding masters of the Ukrainian stage took place: M. Kropivnitsky, I. Karpenko-Kary, P. Saksagansky, M. Staritsky and others.
 1920 – A drama collective "New Theatre" under the management of A. Borisoglebsky was active in the city.
 1934 – The theatre is created the All-Donetsk musical-dramatical theatre based in Mariupol (the head – A. Smirnov, the main director – A. Iskander).
 1959 – The Mariupol theatre is given the status Donetsk State Theatre.
 1960 – November 2, the official opening of the re-constructed theatre and the first performance takes place.
 1978 – The theatre company celebrates the 100th anniversary. The collective is awarded an Honour for significant merits in the theatrical arts.
 1985 – The small stage of theatre is opened.
 2007 – On November 12, by order of the Ministry of Culture and Tourism, the theatre was given the status of an academic theatre.
 2022 – March 16, the theatre was largely destroyed by airstrikes during the 2022 Russian invasion of Ukraine. Hundreds of civilians were apparently sheltering in the building at the time. Satellite imagery taken prior to the airstrikes showed the word "Дети" ("kids" in Russian) painted on the ground at the front and rear of the building, apparently an attempt to warn Russian military planes away. On March 17, Dario Franceschini, Italian Minister of Culture informed on his Twitter page that the Cabinet of Ministers of Italy had approved his proposal to offer Ukraine the resources and means to rebuild the theatre as soon as possible. The bombing resulted in around 600 deaths.

See also

 Donetsk State Academic Opera and Ballet Theatre in Donetsk

References

External links
 Mariupol Rada - Donetsk Academic Regional Drama Theater

1887 establishments in the Russian Empire
2022 disestablishments in Ukraine
Buildings and structures destroyed during the 2022 Russian invasion of Ukraine
Buildings and structures in Mariupol
Culture in Mariupol
Former theatres in Ukraine
Theatres in Donetsk
Tourist attractions in Donetsk Oblast